Poincaré series may refer to

 Poincaré series (modular form), associated to a discrete group, in the theory of modular forms
 Hilbert–Poincaré series, associated to a graded vector space, in algebra